Peter Lamb (born 12 March 1959) is a South African tennis player, who was selected for the national Davis Cup team in 1978, probably mostly to appease protesters against the Apartheid politics of the then South Africa. He was the first ever "coloured" player in the South African national tennis team.  He competed at Vanderbilt University and later received an MBA from Harvard Business School.

References

South African male tennis players
1958 births
Living people
Vanderbilt Commodores men's tennis players
Harvard Business School alumni